The following lists events that happened during 1998 in the Republic of the Congo.

Events

May
 May 5 - Congolese leader, Denis Sassou Nguesso, visits Angola for the second time since he overthrew the former president with the help of Angolan troops.

November
 November 24 - Reports from the Republic of the Congo say that twelve people drowned in a Congolese river when a marine patrol boat tried to intercept a canoe in the Democratic Republic of the Congo. River traffic was suspended between the two countries for security reasons after the Second Congo War began.

References

 
1990s in the Republic of the Congo
Years of the 20th century in the Republic of the Congo
Republic of the Congo
Republic of the Congo